Bleed from Within are a Scottish heavy metal band from Glasgow, formed in 2005. The band's current lineup consists of lead vocalist Scott Kennedy, drummer Ali Richardson, bassist Davie Provan, lead guitarist Craig Gowans, and rhythm guitarist, clean vocalist Steven Jones. The band has released six studio albums and three EPs, with their latest Shrine released on 3 June 2022 through Nuclear Blast.

History

Formation, Humanity, and Empire (2005–2011)

The band formed in Glasgow where they initially met at a youth club where they would cover Lamb of God songs. The first tour that garnered them large scale exposure was in 2010 when they supported Sylosis and While She Sleeps on the Metal Hammer Razor Tour. Early in their career, Bleed from Within also toured with Soilwork, All that Remains, After the Burial, Suicide Silence, Caliban and Rise to Remain.

Uprising (2012–2016)

In August 2012, the band signed to Century Media Records. Their talks with the label started when they were approached after their performance at the 2011 Graspop festival in Belgium, where they were called up as a replacement. After its announcement Bleed From Within issued a very positive statement about their opportunity to join the label's roster: "Century Media have always been a powerhouse in bringing cutting edge new music to the world and we will endeavour to live up to the name." Between September and November 2012, the band supported While She Sleeps across the UK and co-headlined a tour around Europe with Bury Tomorrow. They supported Miss May I on their UK tour in November/December, before starting their studio sessions.

In March 2013, the band completed their first tour of the year, supporting Testament in mainland Europe. Singer Scott Kennedy commented on the difficulty of performing to Testament's crowd citing the older average age of the audience and their lack of familiarity with Bleed from Within's music, but also stated that he felt the band had won over the crowd eventually. On 25 March 2013, Bleed from Within's third studio album Uprising was released on Century Media. Kennedy, when commenting on the album, said that "While it's angry, it's still positive. It's about looking to the light and realising that you're the only person who can make a difference in your life." The drums and vocals were recorded with producer Romesh Dodangoda and guitars and bass with Adam Getgood of Periphery. Uprising spawned two music videos; one for the album's lead single "It Lives in Me" and another for the title track. The album was later made available as a stream prior to its release. It also charted in the United Kingdom at number 13 on the UK Rock Chart. Critically, the album was well received and praised for its improved production and improved songwriting but was also criticised for offering very little in the way of innovation. To promote the album, the band embarked on a headlining tour of the UK.

In June 2013, Bleed from Within supported Megadeth on their four date tour of the United Kingdom. The band stated their excitement about the opportunity to support Megadeth, with Kennedy commenting "As a metal band, to go and support any of the Big 4 is something I never, ever though would happen". Their performances with Megadeth were met with widespread critical acclaim despite reports of ambivalent crowd reactions with English music journalist Malcolm Dome commenting that "You have to feel sorry for Bleed From Within [...] [they] get no more than polite attention from the crowd, and they deserve more". Later in the month, the band was awarded British publication Metal Hammer's Golden Gods Awards for 'Best New Band'.

In November 2013, Bleed from Within were one of four acts alongside Amon Amarth, Hell and Carcass for Metal Hammer's Defenders of the Faith IV tour.

In April 2014, the band announced they had launched an Indiegogo campaign to help crowdfund a 4-track EP, which would act as a bridge between Uprising and their fourth full-length album.

Lineup changes and Era (2017–2019)

In 2017 it was announced that Steven Jones would join the band as a new guitarist and the added addition of clean vocals, replacing Martyn Evans. It was later announced in December that Bleed from Within had finished working on a new studio album set for release in early 2018 and that the first single would be released in January 2018.

The band's fourth album Era was released on 6 April 2018. The first single from the album, "Alive", was released on 19 January 2018.

Fracture (2020–2021)
On 29 November 2019, the band released a new single "The End of All We Know" and also confirmed that the band was working on a new album, which was later titled Fracture and released on 29 May 2020. Matt Heafy from Trivium performs a guest solo on "Night Crossing" from Fracture.

On 12 November 2021, the band released a new single titled "I Am Damnation" and announced that they had signed to metal heavyweight label, Nuclear Blast Records, joining the worldwide family.

Shrine (2022–present)
On 3 March 2022, Bleed From Within announced that their sixth studio album Shrine was set to be released on 3 June 2022 through Nuclear Blast Records, and released the album's second single "Levitate". The album's third single "Stand Down" was released on 14 April, followed by the fourth single "Flesh and Stone" on 12 May.

Musical style 
Bleed from Within's earlier material has been considered deathcore, but the band's general musical style has been stated by critics to be a blend of metalcore, melodic death metal and groove metal. Their stylistic features are their use of "deep heavy breakdowns", growling vocals and groove infused riffs. Metal Hammer Magazine's online editor Merlin Alderslade summarised Bleed from Within's style saying they are "power and groove-laden muscle that modern metal is able to produce".

Their first two albums, Humanity and Empire have been described as "bruising yet melodic" and their debut album  Humanity was considered "straight-up deathcore" as it came out. Their third album Uprising has been described "parts Lamb of God, parts Black Crown-era Suicide Silence and parts Pantera" and Metal Hammer writer Merlin Alderslade believes the band should be compared to Lamb of God and Machine Head rather than the deathcore style of Suicide Silence and early Bring Me the Horizon. The album's typical song structure features sinister guitar riffs to open a song which transitions into "epic metal melodies".

Across the group's discography, it has been noted that Kennedy's vocal style has shifted from the typical deathcore scream/growl vocals of their early releases to a strict throaty growl on more recent albums, with guitarist Steven Jones adding in clean vocals, which has been said to bring more clearness to the lyrics.

Members

Current
 Scott Kennedy – unclean vocals (2005–present)
 Ali Richardson – drums (2005–present)
 Craig "Goonzi" Gowans – bass (2005–2009); lead guitar (2009–present)
 Davie Provan – bass (2009–present)
 Steven "Snev" Jones – rhythm guitar, clean vocals (2017–present)

Former
 Scott McCreadie – lead guitar (2005–2009)
 Dave Lennon – rhythm guitar (2005–2011)
 Martyn Evans – rhythm guitar (2011–2017)

Timeline

Discography 
Studio albums
 Humanity (2009)
 Empire (2010)
 Uprising (2013)
 Era (2018)
 Fracture (2020)
 Shrine (2022)

EPs
 In the Eyes of the Forgotten (2006)	 	 
 Welcome to the Plague Year (2007)
 Death Walk (2014)

Music videos
 "Servants of Divinity" 
 "The Healing"
 "Last of Our Kind"
 "It Lives in Me"
 "Uprising"
"Silence Them All"
"Alive"
 "Afterlife"
 "Crown of Misery"
 "Cast Down"
 "The End of All We Know"
 "Into Nothing"
 "Night Crossing"
 "Fracture"
 "I Am Damnation"
 "Levitate"
 "Stand Down"
 "Flesh and Stone"

Accolades
Metal Hammer Golden Gods Awards

|-
| 2013 || Bleed from Within || Best New Band || 
|-

References

External links 

2005 establishments in Scotland
British melodic death metal musical groups
Deathcore musical groups
Groove metal musical groups
Musical groups from Glasgow
Musical groups established in 2005
Nuclear Blast artists
Musical quintets
Scottish death metal musical groups
Scottish metalcore musical groups